Liu Bingzhang (May 20, 1826 – August 23, 1905) was a Qing dynasty Chinese scholar-official and general. He served as Governor of Jiangxi and Zhejiang provinces and Viceroy of Sichuan. He was a commander in the civil war against the Taiping Rebellion and Nian Rebellion, and the Battle of Zhenhai during the Sino-French War.

Early life 
Liu passed the imperial civil service examination in 1860 and obtained jinshi, the highest degree.

Career 
After obtaining his degree, Liu Bingzhang began his career at the prestigious Hanlin Academy, but was soon sent to the battlefields to help stamp out the Taiping Rebellion. After that, he helped quash the Nian Rebellion. In 1875, he was appointed Governor (xunfu) of Jiangxi Province, but resigned in 1878 in order to return home and fulfill his filial duty for his elderly mother. In 1882, he was appointed Governor of Zhejiang Province, and was responsible for the defense of the Zhejiang coast. In this capacity, he fought in the Battle of Zhenhai against the French fleet. To commemorate the victory, the Chinese government built the Zhenhai Coastal Defense History Museum in Zhenhai, Ningbo in 1997.

He was awarded the position of Viceroy of Sichuan in 1886, and dealt with anti-missionary riots in Sichuan. The Christian missionaries complained that he was not effectively punishing the rioters, and under the pressure of Britain, the Qing court stripped Liu of his position in 1895. He died in 1905.

Legacy 

To commemorate the Battle of Zhenhai, the Chinese government built the Zhenhai Coastal Defense History Museum in Zhenhai, Ningbo in 1997. In 2011, a memorial park was opened in his hometown Wanshan, Lujiang County, Anhui Province, to honor his 185th birthday.

References 

1826 births
1905 deaths
Qing dynasty politicians from Anhui
Governors of Jiangxi
Governors of Zhejiang
Governors of Sichuan
Politicians from Hefei
Viceroys of Sichuan
Huai Army personnel